Colwyn Bay is a town, community and seaside resort in Conwy County Borough on the north coast of Wales overlooking the Irish Sea. It lies within the historic county of Denbighshire. Eight neighbouring communities are incorporated within its postal district. Established as its own separate parish in 1844 with just a small grouping of homes and farms where the community of Old Colwyn stands today, Colwyn Bay has expanded to become the second-largest community and business centre in the north of Wales as well as the 14th largest in the whole of Wales with the urban statistical area, including Old Colwyn, Rhos-on-Sea, and Mochdre and Penrhyn Bay, having a population of 34,284 at the 2011 census.

History 

The western side of Colwyn Bay, Rhos-on-Sea, includes a number of historic sites associated with St Trillo and Ednyfed Fychan, the 13th century general and councillor to Llywelyn the Great.

The name 'Colwyn' may be named after 'Collwyn ap Tangno' who was Lord of Eifionnydd, Ardudwy and part of the Llŷn peninsula, or the River Colwyn in Old Colwyn.

King Richard II (1367-1400) was ambushed in Old Colwyn in 1399 by supporters of Henry Bolingbroke as he returned to England from Ireland.

During World War II the Colwyn Bay Hotel, Marine Road (now demolished) was the headquarters of the Ministry of Food. This also housed the Cocoa & Chocolate division and was the communications hub for the ministry. They continued to use the hotel until 1953. Colwyn also supported the war effort by becoming a significant location for the diamond cutting and polishing industry, which was used to help fund the war effort.

Government 
Bay of Colwyn Town Council is a statutory body, covering the communities in the urban area. It is based at the old police station and magistrates court. The mayor for 2019 to 2020 was Councillor Neil Bastow. Conwy County Borough Council was based at the old civic centre in Colwyn Bay before moving to Coed Pella in Conway Road in Colwyn Bay in November 2018.

Geography 
The town is situated about halfway along the north coast of Wales, between the sea and the Pwllycrochan Woods on the towering hillside. Groes yn Eirias (Welsh:Cross in Torch) was once a separate hamlet centred on the Glyn farmhouse (c1640) but the area is now occupied by the Glyn estate and Eirias Park.

Climate 
As with the rest of the British Isles, Colwyn Bay experiences a maritime climate with cool summers and mild winters, and often high winds. The local climate is well known for the prevalence of Foehn winds - where winds from the South pass over the nearby mountains and warm and dry on their descent, leading to far higher temperatures than otherwise might be expected; the area held the Welsh high temperature record for February at 18.7 °C from 23 February 2012 to 24 February 2019.

Demography 
Prior to local government reorganisation on 1 April 1974 Colwyn Bay was a municipal borough with a population of around 25,000, but in 1974 this designation disappeared leaving five separate parishes, known as communities in Wales, of which the one bearing the name Colwyn Bay encompassed just the central part of the overall town and in the 2001 Census contained just 9,742 people, with the others as follows: Mochdre (1,862), Rhos-on-Sea (7,110), Glan Conwy (2,290), Old Colwyn (7,626) and Llysfaen (2,652). This gives a total figure for the six communities of 31,382, generally referred to as the population of Colwyn Bay, making it the 16th largest urban area in Wales and the second largest settlement in North Wales. Bringing 2011 figures into account that figure is now 33,549. The area is sometimes referred to by the name Bay of Colwyn.

According to the 2011 Census, 17.9% of the population aged three and above noted that they could speak Welsh. The Census also noted that 29.9% of the population who were born in Wales could speak Welsh.

Economy 
The town is dominated by the tourist trade, because of its famous beaches. Colwyn Bay is a Fairtrade Town as certified by the Fairtrade Foundation as part of the Fairtrade Towns scheme.

Culture 
Colwyn Bay hosted the National Eisteddfod in 1910 and 1947. Also The Victoria Pier hosted many dances and shows during the 20th century and became popular with touring bands and artistes through the 1960s up until the final gig there in August 2008.

Community facilities 
The town has parks and gardens and a number of natural amenities such as Eirias Park. Colwyn Bay has received a gold award 8 times in the Wales in Bloom competition. In 2009 and 2010 the town has been invited to enter Britain in Bloom and has been awarded silver gilt in both years. The Welsh Mountain Zoo is nearby.

The Porth Eirias Watersports Centre offers tuition in sailing, windsurfing and power boating as well as kayak and canoe hire. In 2013 it was nominated for Building Design'''s Carbuncle Cup.

 Landmarks 

 
The Victoria Pier was closed to the public in 2009, when a dispute between Conwy County Borough Council and the pier's owner led to him being declared bankrupt. The fate of the pier was initially uncertain; the council hoped it would be "substantially" demolished for "health and safety and visual reasons to be able to re-open that section of the beach”. 
In January 2017, the lower end of the pier partially collapsed into the sea and Conwy Council subsequently announced plans to dismantle and store the pier, with a view of restoring it at a later date. The pier was finally demolished in May 2018.

Llety'r Dryw is a Grade II listed house in Abergele Road, built for the uncle of Anthony Eden and now used as the training centre for North Wales Police. Llys Euryn is a medieval manor house on Bryn Euryn, now in ruins. There are a number of buildings by notable local architect Sidney Colwyn Foulkes. These include Williams Deacon’s Bank 1925 and Colwyn House 1933-7 originally occupied by the W.S.Wood department store. Colwyn Bay Community Hospital was completed in 1925.Cotswold, on Brackley Avenue, is a notable town villa by Alfred Steinthal. Built for a Manchester businesswoman, the house was subsequently the home of Sidney Colwyn Foulkes. It is a Grade II listed building. Its Japanese and Arts and Crafts style gardens are listed, also at Grade II on the Cadw/ICOMOS Register of Parks and Gardens of Special Historic Interest in Wales. Another notable garden is The Flagstaff, overlooking the bay. It was designed by Thomas Hayton Mawson for a house that was not ultimately built, and is listed at Grade II on the Cadw/ICOMOS register.

 Transport 
The town is served by Colwyn Bay railway station located in the town centre on the North Wales Coast Line with trains run by Transport for Wales and Avanti West Coast. 
The A55 road passes through the town, running parallel to the North Wales Coast Line.

Tramline
The Llandudno and Colwyn Bay Electric Railway operated an electric tramway service between  Llandudno and Rhos-on-Sea from 1907 and extended to Colwyn Bay in 1908. The service closed in 1956.

 Education 
Colwyn Bay has three secondary schools - one private and two state. Eirias High School is in Eirias Park and Ysgol Bryn Elian is in Old Colwyn. Ysgol Bryn Elian mainly serves Old Colwyn and Eirias High School mainly serves Colwyn Bay, Rhos on Sea and Penrhyn Bay. 

Rydal Penrhos School is a Methodist public school, which is on multiple sites in the town. Fees at this elite public school exceeded more than £34,000 per year for boarding in 2021 and boasts the only Eton Fives courts in Wales. Former alumni include Princess Maria of Romania, a cousin of Prince  Charles. 

The town's primary schools are Ysgol Nant y Groes, Ysgol Pen-y-Bryn, Ysgol T Gwynn Jones, Ysgol Hen Golwyn, and Saint Joseph's R.C. Primary and the Welsh-language Ysgol Bod Alaw.

 Religious sites 
Churches in and around the town include the parish church St Paul's Church, St David's Welsh Church, St John the Baptist's Church, St Joseph's Roman Catholic Church and Christ Church, Bryn-y-Maen to the south of the town.

 Sport 
The local football team is Colwyn Bay F.C. who play in the Cymru North, the second tier of Welsh football. The local cricket team is Colwyn Bay Cricket Club who play at Penrhyn Avenue and the rugby union team is Colwyn Bay RFC. As of 2012, the RGC 1404 rugby team play at Eirias Stadium in Colwyn Bay as part of a development venture by the WRU.

Colwyn Bay Golf Club (now defunct) was founded in 1893. The club and course closed in 1959 and the land was used for a housing development.

The Black Cat Cycling Club, founded in 2014, is based in Colwyn Bay with members made up of cyclists from the town and the surrounding area.

Glamorgan County Cricket Club traditionally play one first class game a year at Colwyn Bay.

 Notable people See :Category:People from Colwyn Bay William Davies, (born at Groes yn Eirias in 1555) a Welsh Roman Catholic priest and martyr, beatified in 1987. 
 William Roache (born 1932), actor, plays Ken Barlow in Coronation Street'', attended Rydal Penrhos independent day school 
 Terry Jones (1942–2020) actor and comedian with the Monty Python comedy team.
 Alun Michael (born 1943) South Wales Police and Crime Commissioner and former MP
 Timothy Dalton (born 1946) actor, played James Bond, 1986–1994
 Richard Ellis (born 1950), astronomer based in California-based, born and went to school in Old Colwyn
 Paula Yates (1959–2000), British television presenter and writer.
 Helen Willetts (born 1972), a BBC weather reporter.
 The Vivienne (born ca.1985), drag queen, winner of season 1 RuPaul's Drag Race UK

Sport 
 Nancie Colling (1919–2020) an international lawn bowls competitor 
 Tony Lewis (born 1938), cricketer who captained Glamorgan.
 Mike Walker (born 1945), footballer with 656 club caps and former manager of Everton FC and Norwich City FC
 Peter O'Sullivan (born 1951) a former footballer with 530 club caps, mainly with Brighton
 Mickey Thomas (born 1954) footballer, played for Manchester United, Chelsea, Shrewsbury Town and Wrexham with 603 club caps and 51 for Wales, lives in Mochdre.
 Carl Dale (born 1966), footballer for Chester City and Cardiff City with over 430 club caps.
 Ash Dykes (born ca.1980) adventurer and extreme athlete, grew up in Old Colwyn.
 Rachel Taylor (born 1983), Welsh women's rugby international player
 Marc Williams (born 1988) footballer with over 400 club caps

See also 
 Mochdre, a village to the west that was originally part of the Borough.

References

External links 

 
 A Vision of Britain Through Time
 Bay of Colwyn Town Council
 British Listed Buildings
 Clwyd Churches
 Genuki
 Geograph
 Office for National Statistics

 
Towns in Conwy County Borough
Populated coastal places in Wales
Listed buildings in Conwy County Borough
Registered historic parks and gardens in Conwy County Borough